Seeralur is a village in the Thanjavur taluk of Thanjavur district, Tamil Nadu, India.

Demographics 

As per the 2001 census, Siralur had a total population of 541 - 275 males and 266 females. The literacy rate was 84.91%. Siralur is about 8 km west of Thanjavur. The village is surrounded by paddy fields. The village has a Pachayat office, primary school and a library.

References 

 

Villages in Thanjavur district